Tyler Geving (born June 27, 1973) is an American college basketball coach and a former head coach of Portland State University's Vikings men's basketball program. Before accepting the job as head coach, Geving served for four years as the assistant head coach of Portland State under Ken Bone. He was promoted to head coach following Bone's departure to Washington State in April 2009.

Head coaching record

References

1973 births
Living people
American men's basketball players
Basketball coaches from Washington (state)
Basketball players from Washington (state)
Central Washington University alumni
College men's basketball head coaches in the United States
Highline High School alumni
Junior college men's basketball players in the United States
People from Burien, Washington
Portland State Vikings men's basketball coaches
Seattle Pacific Falcons men's basketball coaches
Seattle Redhawks men's basketball coaches
Sportspeople from King County, Washington